Nationality words link to articles with information on the nation's poetry or literature (for instance, Irish or France).

Events
 The Little Review, edited by Margaret Caroline Anderson and Jane Heap, ceases publication
 The Dial ceases publication

Works published in English

Canada
Arthur Bourinot, Ottawa Lyrics and verses for children.
Frederick George Scott, New Poems.

India, in English
 Raul De Loyola Furtado (Poetry in English), The Desperrado, London: Chapman and Hall; Indian poet writing in English and published in the United Kingdom
 Nagendranath Gupta, editor and translator, Eastern Poetry (Poetry in English), Allahabad: Indian Press, (second edition Bombay: Hind Kitabs, 1951), poetry anthology

United Kingdom
 Ursula Bethell, From a Garden in the Antipodes, "by Evelyn Hayes" (pseudonym), London: Sidgwick & Jackson, New Zealand poet published in Britain:
 Edmund Blunden, Near and Far
 Robert Bridges, The Testament of Beauty
 W. H. Davies, Ambition, and Other Poems
 Cecil Day-Lewis, Transitional Poem
 T. S. Eliot:
 Animula
 "Som de l'escalina" (later to become part III of Ash Wednesday, published in 1930) was published in the Autumn, 1929 issue of Commerce along with a French translation.
 Aldous Huxley, Arabia Infelix, and Other Poems
 D. H. Lawrence, Pansies
 Louis MacNeice, Blind Fireworks
 Charlotte Mew, The Rambling Sailor
 William Plomer, The Family Tree
 I. A. Richards, Practical Criticism: A Study in Literary Judgement
 T. H. White, Loved Helen, and Other Poems
 W. B. Yeats, Irish poet published in the United Kingdom:
 A Packet for Ezra Pound
 The Winding Stair

United States
 Léonie Adams, High Falcon
 Conrad Aiken, Selected Poems
 Djuna Barnes, A Night Among the Horses a collection of prose and poetry expanded from her 1923 volume, A Book
 Louise Bogan, Dark Summer
 Witter Bynner, Indian Earth
 James Branch Cabell, Sonnets from Antan
 Malcolm Cowley, Blue Juniata
 Countee Cullen, The Black Christ
 Emily Dickinson, Further Poems, 150 recently discovered poems; Little, Brown, & Company
 Hilda Doolittle, writing under the pen name "H.D.", Red Roses for Bronze
 Kenneth Fearing, Angel Arms
 Robinson Jeffers, Dear Judas and Other Poems
 Vachel Lindsay, Every Soul is a Circus
 Edgar Lee Masters, The Fate of the Jury
 Lola Ridge, Firehead
 Edwin Arlington Robinson, Cavender's House
 E. B. White, The Lady is Cold
 Edmund Wilson, Poets, Farewell
 Elinor Wylie, Angels and Earthly Creatures

Other in English
 Ursula Bethell, From a Garden in the Antipodes, "by Evelyn Hayes" (pseudonym), London: Sidgwick & Jackson, New Zealand poet published in Britain:
 Robin Hyde, The Desolate Star, New Zealand
 Voices from Summerland, the first major anthology of Jamaican poetry
 W. B. Yeats, Irish poet published in the United Kingdom:
 A Packet for Ezra Pound
 The Winding Stair

Works published in other languages

France
 Louis Aragon, La Grande Gaite
 Jacques Audiberti, L'Empire et la Trappe, the author's first book of poems; winner of the Prix Mallarme
 Paul Éluard, L'Amour la poésie
 Oscar Vladislas de Lubicz-Milosz, also known as O. V. de L. Milosz, Poèmes
 Alphonse Métérié, ''Petit Maroc
 Henri Michaux:
 Ecuador, poetry and prose
 Mes Proprietés ("My Properties"), may be considered prose poems
 Pierre Reverdy, Sources du vent
 J. Slauerhoff, Fleurs de Marécage, Dutch poet writing in French, published in Belgium

Indian subcontinent
Including all of the British colonies that later became India, Pakistan, Bangladesh, Sri Lanka and Nepal. Listed alphabetically by first name, regardless of surname:

Hindi
 Jagannathdas Ratnakar, Uddhava Satak, written in Brajabhasa in the Bhramaragit tradition of Krishna Bhakti verse; Hindi
 Nirala Suryakant Tripathi, Parimal, Hindi poems influenced by Chayavadi sensibility; includes "Juhi Ki Kali", a well-known poem in Hindi; also includes "Vidhava" and "Badal Rag"
 Ram Kumar Varma, Cittaur Ki Cita, Hindi-language historical poem on the glory of the Rajputs written in the Chayavadi style
 Ram Naresh Tripathi, Svapna, Hindi epic poem on women and patriotism
 Ramachandra Shukla, Hindi Sahitya Ka Itihas, one of the earliest and most influential histories of Hindi literature; scholarship
 Uday Shankar Bhatta, Takasila, Hindi epic on the ancient glory of the city of Takshasila

Malayalam
 Narayana Panikkar, Kerala Bhasa Sahitya Caritram, literary history in seven volumes, published from this year to 1951; won the first Sahitya Akademi Award for Malayalam literature in 1955; scholarship
 P. K. Narayana Pillai, Tucattezhuttaccan, a study, in Malayalam of 16th-century poet Ezhuttacchan; criticism
 Ullur Paramesvara Iyer:
 Pingala, a well known 

Urdu
 Hafiz Jalandhari, Shahnamah-yi Islam, a history of the Islamic Empire in four volumes of verse, published from this year to 1947
 Mohammad Iqbal, Bang-e-Dara ("The Caravan Bell")
 Dr. Rafiq Hussain and Amar Nath Jha, Urdu ghazal ki nashv o numa, treatise on the evolution of the Urdu ghazal

Other Indian languages
 Devulappali Krishna Shastri, written in Telugu:
 Pravasamu, very influential in Telugu poetry of its time
 Urvasi, very influential in Telugu poetry of its time
 Dharmeshvari Devi Baruani, Phular Sarai, Assamese
 L. Kamal Singh, Lei pareng ("Garland"), Manipuri lyrics, many focusing on love for nature and solitude; academic and anthologist Sisir Kumar Das has called the work a landmark in Manipuri literature with which "modern Manipuri poetry began"
 Mu. Raghava Ayyankar, Alvarkal Kalanilai, literary history of the 12 Alvars, saint poets of the Vaishnava sect, with an evaluation of their works as influenced by various factors; a Tamil-language work
 Jasimuddin, Naksikathar Math, narrative poem in Bengali about a tragic love story of a Hindu boy and a Muslim girl; a companion volume to Rakhali 1930 and Dhankhet 1932
 R. Narasimhachar, Karnataka Kavi Carite, Volume 3 of a three-volume history of Kannada literature, and written in that language (see also Volume 1, 1907); scholarship
 Rabinidrath Thakur, Mahuya, primarily live poems in Bengali
 U. V. Swaminatha Ayyar, Cankattamilum Pirkalattamilum, essays summarizing 10 lectures delivered at Madras University in 1927 on Sangam literature and post-Sangam literature
 Vakil Ahmed Shah Qureshi, Qissa Sulaiman O Bilqis, sufistic narrative poem in Kashmiri
 Zeb-un-Nissa (died 1702), Diwan-i-Makhfi, written in Persian

Spanish language

Spain
 Rafael Alberti:
 Cal y canto ("Lime and Song")
 Sobre los ángeles ("Over the Angels")
 Pedro Salinas, Seguro Azar (1924–1928) ("Certain Chance")
 José Moreno Villa, Jacinta la pelirroja ("Jacinta the Redhead")

Latin America
 José María Eguren, Poesías, Peru
 Carlos Oquendo de Amat, 5 metros de poemas, Peru

Other languages
 Alfred Desrochers, A l'ombre d'Orford, philosophical verse and poetry influenced by le terroir movement, French language, Canada
 Mikhail Kuzmin, The Trout Breaks the Ice, Russian language, Soviet Union
 Peider Lansel, Romansh language, Switzerland
 Rainer Maria Rilke (1875-1926), Letters to a Young Poet, influential compilation of 10 letters sent to military academy cadet Franz Xaver Kappus (1883-1966) from 1902 to 1908, published by Kappus and Insel Verlag this year; Germany

Awards and honors

United States
 American Academy of Arts and Letters Gold Medal for Poetry: Edwin Arlington Robinson
 Pulitzer Prize for Poetry: Stephen Vincent Benét, John Brown's Body

Births
Death years link to the corresponding "[year] in poetry" article:
 January 9 – Heiner Müller (died 1995), German
 January 11 – Peter Dale Scott, Canadian poet and academic
 January 12 – Turner Cassity, American
 February 16 – Peter Porter (died 2010), Australian-born British poet, member of The Group, recipient of Medal of the Order of Australia
 February 28 – John Montague (died 2016), American-born Irish
 March 6 – Günter Kunert (died 2019), German
 April 2 – Edward Dorn (died 1999), American poet associated with the Black Mountain poets
 May 16 – Adrienne Rich (died 2012), American poet
 June 2 – Robert Dana (died 2010), American, poet laureate for the State of Iowa from 2004 to 2008
 June 11 – George Garrett (died 2008), American poet and novelist
 July 13 – Teresa Bogusławska (died 1945), Polish poet and resistance worker
 July 15 – Rhoda Bulter (died 1994), Scottish poet
 July 22 – U. A. Fanthorpe (died 2009), born Ursula Askham Fanthorpe, English
 August 5 – Al Alvarez (died 2019), English poet, writer, editor and critic
 August 11 – Geeta Parikh (died 2012), Gujarati
 August 21 – X. J. Kennedy, American formalist poet, translator, anthologist and writer of children's literature
 August 29 – Thom Gunn (died 2004), English-born poet
 September 26 – Ned O'Gorman (died 2014), American poet and educator
 October 13 – Richard Howard, American poet, literary critic, essayist, teacher and translator
 October 21 – Donald Finkel (died 2008), American poet and academic, husband of poet and novelist Constance Urdang
 October 23 – Shamsur Rahman (also spelled "Shamsur Ruhman") (died 2006), Bengali poet, columnist and journalist
 October 25 – Peter Rühmkorf (died 2008), German writer and poet
 October 26 – Dane Zajc (died 2005), Slovenian poet
 October 28 – John Hollander (died 2013), American poet and literary critic
 November 11 – Hans Magnus Enzensberger (died 2022), German poet and essayist
 December 9 – Don Maclennan (died 2009), English-born South African poet, critic and academic

Deaths
Birth years link to the corresponding "[year] in poetry" article:
 February 27 – Libbie C. Riley Baer (born 1849), American patriotic poet
 March 8 – Geoffrey Anketell Studdert Kennedy, 45 (born 1883), British poet and Anglican priest nicknamed "Woodbine Willy" during World War I for giving Woodbine cigarettes along with spiritual aid to injured and dying soldiers
 March 28 – Katharine Lee Bates, 69, American poet best known as the author of the words to the anthem "America the Beautiful"
 June 8 – Bliss Carman, 68 (born 1861), Canadian poet
 July 15 – Hugo von Hofmannsthal, 55, Austrian novelist, librettist, poet and dramatist
 October – Arno Holz, 66 (born 1863), German Naturalist poet and dramatist
 November 3 – Olav Aukrust, 46 (born 1883), Norwegian poet and teacher

See also

 Poetry
 List of poetry awards
 List of years in poetry
 New Objectivity in German literature and art
 Oberiu movement in Russian art and poetry

Notes

20th-century poetry
Poetry